It'll All Work Out in Boomland is the debut album by British progressive rock band T2, and also their best known album.

Track listing
All tracks written by Dunton

Bonus tracks

Musicians 
 Keith Cross – guitars, keyboards, harmony vocals
 Bernard Jinks – bass guitar, harmony vocals
 Peter Dunton – drums, lead vocals

References

External links 
 It'll All Work Out in Boomland album at Discogs.com

1970 debut albums